Fishhook cactus is a common name for any hook-spined species of the genera Mammillaria, Echinomastus or Sclerocactus. They are small cacti, usually growing up to 6-7 inches (20 cm) high, and are shaped similar to a barrel cactus. They are not to be confused with the fishhook barrel cactus (Ferocactus wislizenii) of the Sonoran and Chihuahuan Deserts. The Fishhook cactus is a large category of around 150 species.

Good places to see "fishhook" Mammillaria are the Sonoran Desert on the U.S. - Mexico border, and the Mesa Verde National Park. Often found growing in desert and rocky locations.

Notable species
The genus Mammillaria also contains "pincushion" and other cacti.
 Mammillaria barbata – green fishhook cactus
 Mammillaria dioica – California fishhook cactus, strawberry cactus
 Mammillaria grahamii – Arizona fishhook cactus
 Mammillaria grahamii var. oliviae – pitahayita
 Mammillaria tetrancistra – common fishhook cactus
 Mammillaria thornberi – Thornber's fishhook cactus

References

Cacti of Mexico
Cacti of the United States
North American desert flora
Flora of the Sonoran Deserts